Aliyah Khalaf Saleh (born c. 1956), also known as Um Qusay, is an Iraqi humanitarian who helped over 50 individuals escape persecution by the Islamic State of Iraq and the Levant in 2014. She is widely regarded as being a folk heroine in Iraq.

Early life 
Saleh was born in Al Alam, near Tikrit, to a Sunni family in 1956 in what was then the Kingdom of Iraq. She was never formally educated, and was married at the age of 13. In the early days of ISIL's occupation of northern Iraq, Saleh's husband and son were killed at a checkpoint while travelling to Mosul.

Humanitarianism 
Saleh lived on the banks of the River Tigris, opposite Camp Speicher, an airbase that had formerly been used by the United States Army during the US occupation of Iraq and was by 2014 being used as a training centre for the Iraqi Army. As ISIL approached Tikrit, soldiers and cadets fled the camp. Many were captured by ISIL, with at least a thousand of them killed in the subsequent Camp Speicher massacre.

Among those fleeing the camp, Saleh was able to rescue over 50 men, including Kurdish, Shia, Yazidi and Christian cadets, many of them fleeing across the river from Camp Speicher. Saleh utilised various methods to hide them from ISIL, including dressing some in women's clothing and hiding them in the women's quarter of her compound. She was also able to obtain identity cards from the University of Tikrit, giving some of the men new identities and teaching them how to say prayers in the Sunni style to avoid sectarian suspicions. Over a five-month period, she smuggled many to safety in the Kurdish-held city of Kirkuk, often hiding them in trucks surrounded by her female relatives. After Saleh's cover was blown, she and 25 members of her family fled, only returning to Tikrit after ISIL's defeat.

Recognition 
In July 2015, the Prime Minister of Iraq Haider al-Abadi presented her with Iraq's Medal of the State in recognition of her actions. She was awarded an International Women of Courage Award in 2018 from the First Lady of the United States, Melania Trump. In 2019, a statue of her likeness was unveiled by the Iraqi Culture Minister, Abdul Amir al-Hamdani, in Baghdad.

Media 
Saleh featured in the 2020 British documentary series Once Upon a Time in Iraq.

References

External links 

Living people
1956 births
Iraqi humanitarians
Iraqi Sunni Muslims
Women humanitarians
People from Saladin Governorate
Recipients of the International Women of Courage Award